Maiestas glabra, formerly Recilia glabra, is a species of bugs from the Cicadellidae family that is endemic to Zhejiang province of China. It was formerly placed within Recilia, but a 2009 revision moved it to Maiestas.

References

Endemic fauna of Zhejiang
Hemiptera of Asia
Maiestas